This is a list of records in the Dakar Rally since 1979.

Records are correct as of the 2023 Dakar Rally. Updates are likely to happen during a rally and are subject to change due to the nature of time penalties occurring throughout the rally.

Bold names indicate active as of the most recently finished rally.

Stage wins for pilots and manufacturers will include any Dakar Experience/joker and prologue stage wins.

Bike

Most wins

Most stage wins

Most stage wins in a single Dakar

Most podiums

Wins by manufacturer

Stage wins by manufacturer 

 Most successful model of bike: KTM 450 Rally with 8 wins

Wins by nationality

Quad 
From 2009

Most wins

Most stage wins

Scratches in a single Dakar 
(since 2010)

Wins by nationality

Wins by manufacturer 

 Most successful model of quad: Yamaha Raptor 700R with 15 wins

Stage wins by manufacturer

Lightweight 
From 2017 SSVs became a separate class from the cars.

From 2021 the Lightweight class was further separated into T3 Lightweight Prototype and T4 Modified Production SSV.

For 2021 all Lightweights were under a single entry list but had separate general classifications. T3s had entry numbers from 380 to 399 and T4s had 400 to 454.

T4 Modified Production SSV

Most wins

Most stage wins

Wins by nationality

Wins by manufacturer 

 Most successful model of UTV: Can-Am Maverick with 3 wins

Stage wins by manufacturer

Wins by co-driver

Stage wins in a single Dakar

T3 Lightweight Prototype 
From 2021

Most wins

Most stage wins

Stage wins in a single Dakar

Wins by manufacturer

Stage wins by manufacturer

Wins by co-driver

Wins by nationality

Car

Most wins

Most stage wins

Most stage wins in a single Dakar

Most podiums

Wins by nationality

Wins by manufacturer 

 Most successful model of car: Mitsubishi Pajero Evolution with 12 wins

Stage wins by manufacturer

Truck

Most wins

Wins by nationality

Most stage wins 
(Since 1999)

Stage wins in a single Dakar 
(since 1999)

Wins by manufacturer 

 Most successful model of truck: Tatra 815 with 6 wins

Stage wins by manufacturer 
(since 1997)

Classic 
From 2021

Most wins

Most stage wins

Scratches in a single Dakar

Most podiums

Fewest points at finish

Wins by nationality

Wins by manufacturer

Stage wins by manufacturer

Overall

Wins

Stage wins

Wins by manufacturer

Stage wins by manufacturer

Rally

Entrants
 Highest number of entrants (including 224 assistance cars and trucks): 688  (2005)
 Highest number of entrants (only competitors): 603  (1988)
 Highest number of female entrants: 17 (2019)

Finishers
 Highest number of finishers: 317 (2022) (446 including Classic)
 Highest percentage of entrants finishing: 77.51% (2017) (80.94% including Classic)
 Lowest number of entrants: 153 (1993)
 Lowest number of finishers: 67 (1993)
 Lowest percentage of entrants finishing: 20.58% (1986)

Distance
 Longest rally: 15,000 km/9,320 miles (1986)
 Shortest rally: 6263 km/3,892 miles (1981)

Countries
 Most countries: 11 in 1992 (France, Libya, Niger, Chad, Central African Republic, Cameroon, Gabon, Congo, Angola, Namibia, South Africa)
 Fewest countries: 1 in 2019 (Peru), 2020 - 2023 (Saudi Arabia)

Individuals 
 Highest percentage of stage wins in a single rally: Seth Quintero with 92.31% (12/13) (2022)
 Most podiums without a win: Yoshimasa Sugawara with 7 podiums (6x  and 1x )
 Most entries: Yoshimasa Sugawara with 36 entries
 Most consecutive entries: Yoshimasa Sugawara with 35 entries (1983 – 2019)
 Most finishes: Yoshimasa Sugawara with 29 finishes
 Most consecutive finishes: Yoshimasa Sugawara with 20 (1989 – 2009)
 Most classes competed in: Kees Koolen 5 classes (Bike/Quad/Car/Truck/ssv), Yoshimasa Sugawara 3 classes (Bike/Car/Truck) and Cyril Despres 3 classes (Bike/Car/SSV)
 Oldest competitor: Marcel Hugueny at 81 years (1995)
 Oldest rookie: Graham Knight at 68, ? months, ? days (2020)
 Oldest winner: Josef Macháček  at 63, 10 months, 2 days (2021)
 Youngest competitor: Mitchel van den Brink at 16 years, 357 days (2019)
 Youngest winner of a stage: Eryk Goczał  at 18, 2 months, ? days (Stage 1, 2023)
 First female winner (cars): Jutta Kleinschmidt (2001)
 Fewest Classic points: 399 Serge Mogno (2022)
 Most Classic points: 307,707 Roberto Camporese (2021)
 Most Classic penalty points: 87,420 Ignacio Corcuera (2021)

Vehicle 
 Most successful vehicle model: Mitsubishi Pajero Evolution with 12 wins
 Most manufacturer wins: Kamaz with 19 wins. 
 Most manufacturer finishes: Yamaha (bikes), Honda (bikes), Toyota (cars) had a vehicle finish in all 43 rallies

Countries

Number of times started in

Number of times finished in

Number of times entered

References 

Dakar Rally
Auto racing records